Kyle McCall (born 2 January 1992) is an Irish professional rugby union player who played for Ulster. He has progressed his rugby career through the traditional school system where he captained Wallace High School and was capped for both Ulster and Irish schools.

Kyle is an aggressive, compact scrummager. His complete skill set is complemented by exceptional mobility and an appetite for work. Kyle's deft handling skills aligned with his power and pace make him a genuine ball-carrying option in the loose.

In 2010 Kyle McCall became a member of the Ulster Rugby Academy where his development has flourished representing the Ulster Ravens in the inter-pro championship and British and Irish Cup.

Kyle McCall's first appearance for Ulster came in 2013 against Leinster as a replacement. He made quite the impact by holding up a Leinster player over the line in the dying seconds to secure a memorable victory for Ulster.

He started his first European Club match in the 38–0 victory over Toulouse.

McCall left Ulster in 2021.

References

External links
Ulster Rugby Profile
Ireland U20 Profile

1992 births
Living people
Irish rugby union players
Rugby union props
Ulster Rugby players
Rugby union players from Belfast